Michael Doughty may refer to:

 Michael Doughty (Australian footballer) (born 1979), Australian rules footballer for Adelaide
 Michael Doughty (field hockey) (born 1932), British Olympic hockey player
 Michael Doughty (footballer, born 1992), Welsh footballer
 Mike Doughty (born 1970), American indie and alternative rock singer-songwriter
 Mike Doughty (co-driver) (born 1936), former Kenyan rally co-driver
 Michael Doughty (MP) for Liverpool (UK Parliament constituency), Preston and Flint Boroughs, in 1593–1597